George Constantine Silides (June 28, 1922 – February 17, 2022) was an American politician who was a member of the Alaska Senate from 1973 to 1974. A Republican, Silides was appointed to fill the vacancy created when Don Young was elected to the United States House of Representatives.

Life and career
Silides was born in New York City, New York and graduated from Stuyvesant High School in 1938. He graduated from United States Military Academy at West Point in 1946 with an engineering degree. He served in the United States Army. He moved to Alaska and started an engineering firm near Fairbanks.

Prior to serving in the Senate, Silides ran unsuccessfully three times for the Alaska House.

In 1976, Silides brought a case to the Alaska Supreme Court asserting that he complied with the filing requirements of the state in an attempt to run for House District 20.

Silides moved to Escondido, California with his wife, when he retired. He died on February 17, 2022, in Escondido, at the age of 99.

References

1922 births
2022 deaths
20th-century American politicians
Republican Party Alaska state senators
Businesspeople from Fairbanks, Alaska
Politicians from Fairbanks, Alaska
Military personnel from New York City
Politicians from New York City
People from Escondido, California
United States Military Academy alumni
Stuyvesant High School alumni